chntpw is a software utility for resetting or blanking local passwords used by Windows NT, 2000, XP, Vista, 7, 8, 8.1 and 10.  It does this by editing the SAM database where Windows stores password hashes.

Features 
There are two ways to use the program: via the standalone chntpw utility installed as a package available in most modern Linux distributions (e.g. Ubuntu) or via a bootable CD/USB image. There also was a floppy release, but its support has been dropped.

Limitations 
chntpw has no support for fully encrypted NTFS partitions (the only possible exceptions to this are encrypted partitions readable by Linux such as e.g. LUKS), usernames containing Unicode characters, or Active Directory passwords (with the exception of local users of systems that are members of an AD domain). The password changing feature also isn't fully functional either, so password blanking is highly recommended (in fact, for later versions of Windows that's the only possible option). Furthermore, the bootable image might have problems with controllers requiring 3rd party drivers. In such cases use of the stand-alone program in a full-featured Linux environment is recommended.

Where it is used 
The chntpw utility is included in many various Linux distributions, including ones focused on security:
 Kali – security-focused Linux distribution
 SystemRescueCD – recovery-focused Linux distribution
 Fedora – general distribution
 Ubuntu – linux distribution published by Canonical
 (along with many others not listed here)

License change 
For the software's 10th anniversary, the author changed the license from a non-commercial one to the GNU General Public License (GPL) Version 2.

References

External links 
 

Free security software
Operating system distributions bootable from read-only media